Isonandra is a genus of plants in the family Sapotaceae found in tropical Asia, described as a genus in 1840.

Isonandra is native to India, Sri Lanka, Malaysia, and Borneo.

species

References

 
Sapotaceae genera
Taxonomy articles created by Polbot